Playfair Mountains is a group of mountains between the Swann and Squires Glaciers in southeast Palmer Land. The mountains were first seen and photographed from the air by the United States Antarctic Service (USAS), 1939–41. They were mapped by United States Geological Survey (USGS) from surveys and U.S. Navy air photos, 1961–67. Named by Advisory Committee on Antarctic Names (US-ACAN) for John Playfair (1748–1819), Scottish mathematician and geologist.

Mountain ranges of Palmer Land